Old, New, Borrowed, and Blue may refer to:

 Old New Borrowed and Blue, an album by Slade
 Old, New, Borrowed, and Blue (Paul Carrack album)
 Old, New, Borrowed, and Blue (Roxx Gang album)